Tribu Baharú is a Champeta criolla and World music band from Bogotá, Colombia.
Champeta was swept away by the ubiquitous Reggaeton in the '90s but Tribu Baharú are part of a wave of nuevas musicas Colombianas based in the capital city who are reestablishing it as a prime force and adding more ingredients to the recipe.

Biography

Discography

Members 
 Boricua (guitar, producer) 
 Chindo (bass, backing vocals) 
 Juan Sebastian Bastos (Sound Engineer) 
 Makambille (vocals) 
 Moniqui (percussions) 
 Pocho (director, drums, backing vocals) 
 Shaka (MC, backing vocals)

References

External links 
Tribu Baharú Official Website
Tribu Baharú on SoundCloud

Afro-Colombian
Caribbean music
Colombian musical groups